Beta Ray Bill is a fictional superhero appearing in American comic books published by Marvel Comics. Debuting in the Bronze Age of Comic Books, the character was initially intended to be a surprise; an apparent monster who unexpectedly turns out to be a great hero. As such, Bill is the first being outside the Marvel Universe's Norse pantheon to be introduced as being worthy to wield Thor's hammer, Mjolnir. After an initial rivalry for possession of the weapon, the alien warrior was granted a war hammer of his own, called Stormbreaker, and the two reconciled as staunch allies, going on to fight side by side.

Beta Ray Bill has been featured in other Marvel-endorsed products, such as animated television series, video games, and merchandise.

Publication history
Beta Ray Bill debuted in The Mighty Thor #337 (November 1983), being established as an alien of the Korbinite race.

Bill was created by Walt Simonson as a new concept for the title Thor. Simonson said,

During a "Thor Spotlight" panel at the Baltimore Comic Con, August 28, 2010, Simonson further stated:

The character's introduction continued in Thor vol. 1 #338–340. He continued to make appearances in Thor sporadically. He appeared in the Maximum Security crossover in January 2001 and the Secret Invasion crossover in 2008. He starred in the six-issue miniseries Stormbreaker: The Saga of Beta Ray Bill and its two follow-ups, the one-shot Beta Ray Bill: The Green of Eden and three-issue Beta Ray Bill: Godhunter. A Beta Ray Bill mini-series was published in 2021 with a confrontation with Fin Fang Foom.

Fictional character biography

1980s
Spy organization S.H.I.E.L.D. detected an alien fleet passing through Earth's galaxy, with Director Nick Fury asking Thor to investigate. When Thor finds the advanced ship, it scans Thor and perceives him to be a threat.  Unable to stop Thor, the sentient ship—called Skuttlebutt—revives Beta Ray Bill, who is in suspended animation. Bill battles Thor to a standstill, until the ship reaches the Solar system, where one of the mystical enchantments of Thor's hammer Mjolnir comes into effect, which means that Thor will revert to his mortal persona of Donald Blake if separated from the hammer for more than 60 seconds. When that happens, Blake is knocked unconscious by Bill, who examines Blake's cane (Mjolnir's "shell" when Thor is in Blake's form) and, upon striking the cane, received Thor's power and a variant of his costume.

Once Skuttlebutt arrives on Earth, Bill easily defeats an approaching S.H.I.E.L.D. team and is then transported to Asgard by the King of the Norse gods, Odin, who mistakes Bill for Thor. After some initial confusion, Odin returns Thor to Asgard, and Bill's origin is revealed. Bill's race, the Korbinites, were almost rendered extinct when their galaxy exploded. The remnants of the Korbinite race fled in a fleet of warships, guarded by a sentient ship called Skuttlebutt and a dedicated champion, Beta Ray Bill. Via Korbinite science, Bill was physically augmented and given the attributes of an indigenous wild beast (a process that killed all of Bill's predecessors). Skuttlebutt attacked Thor because the ship recognized the Asgardian magic as similar to that of the previous global threat, and assumed the Korbinites were being threatened once again.

On discovering that Bill was worthy enough to lift Mjolnir, Odin proposes a battle to the death in the fiery Asgardian realm of Skartheim to decide who will wield the hammer. Bill and Thor render each other unconscious. Bill's resistance to heat allows him to recover first, however, and he is deemed the winner—but he also saves Thor from falling into lava, believing he is too worthy an opponent to die, but he feels he needs the hammer to protect his people. After Bill reconsiders his claim to the hammer, Odin orders the making of a new hammer for Bill: Stormbreaker, equal in power to Mjolnir and created from the same metal and by the same dwarfs led by Eitri. Odin also transfers an enchantment from Mjolnir to Stormbreaker, so that Bill can return to his original Korbinite form by striking Stormbreaker upon the ground—and Thor can no longer become Donald Blake. After learning that the mishap that killed most of Bill's people was caused by the fire demon Surtur, one of Asgard's most powerful enemies, Bill agrees to join the Asgardians in a war to stop Surtur and his armies.

Bill leads many of Earth's heroes against Surtur's forces on Earth while Thor, Odin, and Thor's adopted brother Loki confront Surtur in Asgard. Surtur is eventually defeated, but apparently kills Odin when they both fall through a mystic portal. Bill remains on Earth, aiding the spaceknight Rom against the threat of the alien Dire Wraiths  and foes such as Iron Man opponent Titanium Man.

Forming an attachment with the Asgardian goddess Sif, Bill aids Thor against the Dark Elf Kurse in a two-part storyline before returning to his people.

1990s
Bill remains a staunch ally of Thor and Asgard before featuring in a storyline involving a creation of Galactus, Tyrant. Bill also features in the storyline "Blood and Thunder", attempting, alongside Adam Warlock, Thanos and others, to deal with the "warrior madness" of Thor through which he is trying to destroy the universe, although at one point he is struck with enough force to destroy a planet.<ref>Silver Surfer vol. 3, #86–87 (November – December 1993); Warlock Chronicles #7-8 (Jan.-Feb. 1994); Warlock and the Infinity Watch #25 (Feb. 1994); Thor #461 (April 1993); #468 (November 1983); #470–471 (January – February 1994)</ref> Together with Thor, Bill joins with other versions of the Thunder God in the Thor Corps against the entity Demonstaff. and has several cosmic adventures.

2000s
Bill also participates in a battle between the heroes of Earth and several alien races such as the Kree, Shi'ar, and Z'Nox. and after several adventures with Thor  guest starring in the final storyline, when Thor—determined to end the perpetual cycle of death and rebirth the Asgardians are trapped in—brings about Ragnarök (in Norse mythology this event means the end of Asgard and its gods, as they die in battle against the armies of evil). Although Bill attempts to aid the Asgardians, Thor teleports Bill away as it is not his destiny to die in Ragnarök.

Bill visits his people's new homeworld, where he is attacked by his insane predecessor, Alpha Ray, defeating him just as the cosmic entity Galactus and his herald Stardust arrive. Despite Bill's efforts, Galactus consumes the world and almost kills him, with Bill drifting in space until recovered by Skuttlebutt. After finding an orb containing the souls of many of the Korbinites, Bill revisits a desolate Asgard, and joins forces with Stardust to battle a new demonic menace named Asteroth.

Although victorious, Bill is mortally wounded, and while near death is healed by an unknown entity that also claims the remaining souls in the orb. Placed in the recently deceased body of a war veteran named Simon Walters (a reference to his creator, Walt Simonson) on Earth, Bill has a brief encounter with the villain Boar and the hero Spider-Man. Bill eventually finds and joins Canadian superhero team Omega Flight against the supervillain team the Wrecking Crew, who release the supernatural Great Beasts. The battle ends with Bill and the Beasts trapped in an alternate dimension.

During the Secret Invasion storyline, Bill is wounded and captured by the alien Skrulls, who bestow his hammer Stormbreaker on a warrior Super-Skrull called the Godkiller. Thor rescues Bill, although Loki starts a rumor that Bill may be a Skrull, causing some Asgardians to go against him despite Balder telling them to stop. Thor throws Mjolnir at Bill, who catches it, proving he really is Bill. After being nursed back to health, the character retrieves his hammer. Although the Godkiller defeats him, with Thor's help, he tricks the Godkiller, causing Asgard to fall onto it, killing the Skrull. Thor and Bill then raise the city again.

Bill decides to hunt the cosmic entity Galactus, to avenge the destruction of the Korbinites' second homeworld, and the seeming eradication of his species. After a brief confrontation with the herald, Stardust, Bill is intercepted by the Silver Surfer, who is puzzled by the Korbinite's apparently futile quest to destroy Galactus. During a brief battle, Bill explains that while he understands he cannot hope to destroy Galactus with his power alone, he intends to destroy Galactus by annihilating any and all worlds Galactus seeks to feed from, thus starving him to death. The character's obsession with stopping Galactus eventually results in him being unable to lift his own enchanted weapon, an object that can only be wielded by the worthy. Equipped with alien weapons, Bill finds Galactus  but discovers the entity already under attack by another race. In a moment of conscience, Bill saves Galactus. The grateful entity rewards Bill by creating a Korbinite mate for him, with Bill also regaining the ability to wield Stormbreaker.

2010s
When the universe is invaded during The Thanos Imperative storyline, Beta Ray Bill joins Cosmo's select group to travel across the Fault and into the Cancerverse. Bill is recruited by Cosmo to join the Annihilators, a new super-group intended to replace the fallen Guardians of the Galaxy. The Annihilators defend Galador from the Dire Wraiths, resulting in a peace between the two groups who have been at war for generations. Later, when trying to end a conflict between warring factions of the Universal Church of Truth, the Annihilators are transported to a Church base on Earth and come into conflict with the Avengers.

During the "Death of the Inhumans" miniseries, Medusa and the surviving Inhuman Royal Family members ask for Beta Ray Bill to help to confront the Kree and their Super-Inhuman Vox as well as rescuing Black Bolt from them. Beta Ray Bill agreed to help them. When they reach the location where Black Bolt is being attacked by Vox, Beta Ray Bill helps Black Bolt, and takes down Vox, who is revealed to be a brainwashed Maximus. He and the Inhuman Royal Family witness something on the Vox costume teleport Crystal away while also killing Maximus.

When Thor became unworthy of Mjolnir after Nick Fury whispered a secret to him, Thor spent months drinking and fighting to avoid thinking about his loss. Bill eventually came to visit Thor- now calling himself 'Odinson'- and offered his old friend Stormbreaker instead, only for Odinson and Bill to be captured by the Collector as they examined the remains of Asgard where the hammer of an alternate version of Thor had recently crashed. Although the Collector tried to force Odinson to help him find some means of bypassing the worthiness enchantment so that he could lift the hammer himself, Odinson eventually escaped and used the hammer's power to return Asgard to its original place. Once free, Odinson told Bill that the secret Fury had shared with him was "Gorr was right", a reference to Thor's old foe Gorr the God Butcher who believed that all gods brought nothing but pain and suffering to the universe. However, Bill assured Odinson that, regardless of his ability to wield Mjolnir, even if the gods were not worthy, Odinson proved himself to be a hero as he continued to fight for humanity even when officially unworthy.

Powers and abilities

Beta Ray Bill's life force and consciousness were transferred by scientists of his race into the body of an alien carnivorous equine-like beast that had been bionically restructured into a cyborg. Courtesy of highly advanced genetic engineering and cyborg implants, Beta Ray Bill possesses vast superhuman strength, speed, stamina and durability, and a highly extended lifespan. Beta Ray Bill is also a superior hand-to-hand combatant. His combat prowess is such that he was able to fight Thor, noted as one of the best hand-to-hand fighters in the Marvel Universe, to a standstill.

Beta Ray Bill's weapon, Stormbreaker, also has the same properties as Thor's hammer, Mjolnir, and includes the ability to transform into a cane when struck upon the ground and return Bill to his unaltered Korbinite form.

Beta Ray Bill has a partner in the form of a Korbanite sentient warship named Skuttlebutt. The same technology that transferred Bill's consciousness into his cyborg body, was also used to transfer an unknown Korbanite's consciousness into a large combat cruiser retrofitted with medical, cargo, and humanitarian equipment and facilities to accommodate the attempt to transport Bill's people off planet to avoid the incoming attack by Galactus. Loyal Skuttlebutt often uses his medical facilities to repair Bill's tissue and implants from damage after battles.

Reception
 In 2018, CBR.com ranked Beta Ray Bill 11th in their "25 Fastest Characters In The Marvel Universe" list.

In other media
Television
 Beta Ray Bill appears in the Silver Surfer episode "Innervisions", voiced by Karl Pruner. This version and his species share a group dream using a special "dream weaver" from Zenn-La. When the Silver Surfer comes to alert them of Thanos, he convinces Bill to end the group dream and save the planet by using the dream weaver's power to trick Thanos into believing he succeeded in destroying the planet.
 Beta Ray Bill appeared in The Super Hero Squad Show episode "The Ballad of Beta Ray Bill! (Six Against Infinity, Part 1)", voiced by Pat Fraley. After the Korbinites were enslaved by the Stranger, Bill took refuge in the Skuttlebutt space station, working as its janitor ever since. When Thor ends up on the Skuttlebutt following a battle with the Dark Surfer and the Stranger finds them, Bill helps Thor defeat the Stranger and free his people using Mjolnir. Following the battle, Mjolnir transforms Bill's toilet brush into a hammer he eventually dubs "Stormbreaker" and Bill works with his people to help Thor get back to Earth.
 Beta Ray Bill appeared in The Avengers: Earth's Mightiest Heroes episode "The Ballad of Beta Ray Bill", voiced by Steve Blum. After Surtur destroys the Korbinites' homeworld, the survivors genetically modify Bill before going into hibernation on the Skuttlebutt starship, with Bill serving as their protector while he searches for a new world for them. When Surtur's fire demons attack the Skuttlebutt, Thor intervenes. However, Bill initially mistakes him for a threat and wields Mjolnir against him, only to be teleported to Asgard by Odin, who was trying to bring Thor back. Bill attacks all of the Asgardians present until Odin subdues him. Realizing his mistake, Bill reveals his plight to the Asgardians and travels with Thor and Sif to see Eitri for help. Following this, Bill receives Stormbreaker and joins Thor and Sif in fighting off the remaining fire demons and the Enchantress. Once the Skuttlebutt is safe, Bill departs to continue his mission, promising to help Thor battle Surtur.

Film
 Beta Ray Bill can be seen as an Easter Egg in Thor: Ragnarok. Beta Ray Bill can be seen in one of the totems being built in Sakaar.
 Beta Ray Bill appears in Planet Hulk, voiced by Paul Dobson. Having been previously captured and brainwashed by the Red King, Bill is forced to fight the Red King's gladiators until Hulk destroys the mind control disk and nearly kills Bill while his guard was down. Bill later saves Hulk and the gladiators, freeing them of their control disks and offering to bring Hulk back to Earth, though Hulk declines.
 Beta Ray Bill was included in an early version of the Marvel Cinematic Universe film Thor: Ragnarok, though he ultimately did not make an appearance. Producer Kevin Feige said, "it was so quick... and it just didn’t do it justice. And the feeling is, if you can’t do it justice, do it later".

Video games
 Beta Ray Bill appears as an alternate costume for Thor in a Marvel: Ultimate Alliance and Marvel Heroes.
 Beta Ray Bill appears as DLC in Lego Marvel Super Heroes, voiced by Steven Blum.
 Beta Ray Bill appears in Guardians of the Galaxy: The Universal Weapon.
 Beta Ray Bill appears as a playable character in Marvel: Avengers Alliance.
 Beta Ray Bill appears as a playable character in Lego Marvel's Avengers, again voiced by Steven Blum.
 Beta Ray Bill appears as a playable character in Marvel: Future Fight''.

Merchandise
 The character received a 6-inch figure in the Marvel Legends toy line in 2006.
 The Classic Marvel Figurine Collection issued a 96mm Beta Ray Bill statue as number 140.
 A Minimate version of Bill was released in November 2011. One version was released with an "Armored Thor" (based on the Walt Simonson run), while another was released in a "Stormbreaker" box-set with figures of Thor, Sif and Loki, all based on Simonson's art.
 Beta Ray Bill was released as part of the Marvel Universe 3 3/4 inch toyline in 2012.
 Beta Ray Bill is a playable character in the "Critical Mass" and "Galactic Guardians" sets of Marvel HeroClix.
 Beta Ray Bill was released as part of the 2019 Marvel Legends toy line for Endgame Wave 2, Smirking Hulk BAF.
 Beta Ray Bill was released as a Funko pop in 2020, under the Marvel 80th Anniversary series.

Collected editions

References

External links
 
 AlphaFlight.net - Alphanex Entry on Beta Ray Bill
 Beta Ray Bill at the Marvel Database Project
 

Characters created by Walt Simonson
Comics characters introduced in 1983
Fictional characters with superhuman durability or invulnerability
Fictional hammer fighters
Guardians of the Galaxy characters
Marvel Comics characters who can move at superhuman speeds
Marvel Comics characters who use magic
Marvel Comics characters with accelerated healing
Marvel Comics characters with superhuman strength
Marvel Comics cyborgs
Marvel Comics extraterrestrial superheroes
Thor (Marvel Comics)